Pakt s Đavolom (Deal with the Devil) is a collaborative album by Bosnian rappers Jala Brat and Buba Corelli. It was released 13 December 2014 through Tempo Production and the RedEye Vision Studio. It is their second project together following the EP Sin City (2013).

Background
Jala Brat and Buba Corelli collaborated on the EP Sin City, released in March 2013. Soon after, they began recording sessions for a studio album which evolved into the LP Pakt s Đavolom.

Singles
The album's lead single "Bez tebe" premiered 16 November 2014. The follow-up single "22" was officially released the same day as the album. The album produced two more hit singles "Trinidad i Tobago" and "Borba".

Release
The full studio album was released by the label Tempo Production on 13 December 2014.

Track listing

External links
Pakt s Đavolom on Discogs

References

2014 albums
Jala Brat albums
Buba Corelli albums